The Women's Football League was a small women's American football league that began playing in 2002. Its last season was in 2007. It was composed of four teams, one in Grand Rapids, Michigan, one in Tennessee, one in North Carolina, and one in Jacksonville, Florida (Jacksonville Dixie Blues), who now play in the Women's Football Alliance.

Teams included the Jacksonville Blues, Kentucky Force, Mississippi Rapids and Tennessee Heat
Former teams included the Alabama Racers, Atlanta Xtreme, DC Slammers, Fayetteville Thunder, Florida Typhoons, Louisiana Gators, Memphis Maulers, South Carolina Raptors, Virginia Spears, Fayetteville Warriors and North Carolina Cougars

League Champions
2006 - Jacksonville Dixie Blues
2007 - Jacksonville Dixie Blues

See also 
List of leagues of American football

References

External links
Women's Football League

Women's American football leagues
Sports leagues established in 2002
Sports leagues disestablished in 2007
2002 establishments in the United States
2007 disestablishments in the United States